Caliper, A PerkinElmer Company produces  products and services for life sciences research. The firm, founded in 1995,  is based in Hopkinton, Massachusetts with direct sales, service and application-support operations in countries around the globe.   The firm's products  include instruments, software and reagents, laboratory automation tools  microfluidics, lab automation & liquid handling, optical imaging technologies, and  services for drug discovery & drug development.

Products

Microfluidic platform 
Caliper is a pioneer in microfluidic lab-on-a-chip technology. Its microfluidic lab-on-a-chip products, including a proprietary microfluidic sipper chip,  are a high-throughput complement to the firm's planar chips.

Optical imaging 
Through its acquisition of Xenogen Corporation in 2006, the firm is now a developer of in vivo biophotonic imaging technology, which allows for real-time, non-invasive exploration of  genes , proteins, pathogens, and tumor cells in living animals.  It offers a range of patented biophotonic and fluorescent imaging technologies, as well as genetically modified animal programs. Its imaging product lines include a suite of IVIS imaging systems, many measuring both bio luminescence and fluorescence, in vivo imaging reagents, specialized light producing animal models, and genetic modification programs for pharmaceutical and biotechnology research and development.

Lab automation and liquid handling 
Caliper produced the world's first lab robotic system, the Zymark Zymate.  In January 2009, it produced the benchtop system Zephyr Genomics Workstation for automating routine processes for molecular biology such as nucleic acid purification, reaction setup and normalization.

The firm produces other robotic systems is to automate solid phase extraction and several liquid handling and plate management systems to automate drug discovery and development. It  also custom designs integrated vendor-neutral instruments and software.

Discovery and development outsourcing 
Caliper's Discovery Alliances & Services division (CDAS) was created from the acquisitions of NovaScreen, a provider of in vitro & in vivo discovery services.  The in vitro service arm of CDAS includes in vitro drug discovery and development , including   screening assays to define the mode of action, side effect profiles, selectivity, and other relevant activities of drug candidates. In vivo capabilities include:  non-invasive in vivo optical imaging, OncoMouse studies, and in vivo compound evaluations for safety assessment and drug repositioning.

History 
Caliper Life Sciences was founded in 1995 by Larry Bock and Drs. Michael Knapp, Michael Ramsey and Andreas Manz. as Caliper Technologies,  with a  focus on microfluidics technology. In 2003, the firm acquired Zymark, a leader in laboratory automation and robotics, and was renamed Caliper Life Sciences.  In October 2005, it acquired NovaScreen Biosciences Corporation a privately held CRO offering pre-clinical drug discovery and development services.   In August 2006, it acquired Xenogen Corporation,  a developer of in vivo optical imaging systems (IVIS systems) and its division, Xenogen Biosciences, a CRO offering in vivo transgenic animal production, phenotyping, gene targeting and in vivo optical imaging services.

At the end of October 2008, SOTAX,a tester and software developer of medical devices, acquired Caliper's Pharmaceutical Development & Quality Analysis (PDQ) Division for $15.8 Million. On November 10, 2008, Caliper's Auto Trace(r) line of product was acquired by Dionex. In December 2009, Taconic Biosciences acquired XenoGen Biosciences in vivo pre-clinical CRO subsidiary of Caliper Life Sciences.  A year later in December 2010, Caliper purchased Cambridge Research & Instrumentation Inc. for about $20 million in a cash and stock deal.

In September 2011, PerkinElmer agreed to buy Caliper Life Sciences for $600 million. On November 7, 2011, PerkinElmer completed the acquisition of Caliper Life Sciences for a total net purchase price of approximately $600 million in cash.

References

External links 
 Caliper, A PerkinElmer Company Company Profile at Google Finance.

Biotechnology companies of the United States
Life sciences industry
Medical technology companies of the United States
Biotechnology companies established in 1995
1995 establishments in Massachusetts
Manufacturing companies established in 1995